The mantura or mandoura, is a Greek wind musical instrument of Cretan origin. It has 4 to 6 holes for the fingers and produces sound with the help of the tongue. Mantura is very widespread in Crete and the Greek islands.

See also
Askomandoura
Greek musical instruments
Greek folk music
Greek music

References
Traditional Greek instruments

Greek musical instruments
Greek music